Nora's Fish Creek Inn is in Wilson, Wyoming. It was owned by Nora Tygum, Trace Tygum, and Kathryn Tygum Taylor. In 2012, it was recognized by the James Beard Foundation as an American Classic.  Due to fading health, in 2014 Nora Tygum turned operations over to her son Trace Tygum, and to her daughter Katheryn Tygum Taylor.

References

Buildings and structures in Teton County, Wyoming
James Beard Foundation Award winners
Restaurants in Idaho